The history of Dedham, Massachusetts, from 1800 to 1899 saw growth and change come to the town. In fact, the town changed as much during the first few decades of the 19th century as it did in all of its previous history.

Having been named Dedham shiretown of the newly formed Norfolk County in 1793, the town got an influx of new residents and visitors. This growth was aided by new turnpikes and railroads, with taverns popping up to serve travelers. In the 19th century many former farms became businesses and homes for those who commuted into Boston. The population of the town more than tripled in this period.

The Town government expanded dramatically with the institution of the public library,  the police department, fire department, and others. St. Mary's Church was established, with William B. Gould doing the plaster work. The congregation at St. Paul's constructed a number of churches, and First Church suffered a schism. A number of schools were established, including Dedham High School. The Town was central to two  major court cases, the Fairbanks Case and the Dedham Case.

The "scenery" of the town was described as "varied and picturesque" with "an appearance of being well kept." Several new towns broke away, including Dover, Westwood, and Norwood.

Government
By 1836, Dedham "had long been a focus for the vigorous political activity popularly associated with the Jacksonian era."

The Dedham Public Library was established in 1872 and first occupied rented space at the corner of Court Street and Norfolk Street. It built a permanent home in 1886 at the corner of Church and Norfolk Streets using funds left by Hannah Shuttleworth. The building, made of Dedham Granite and trimmed with red sandstone, opened in 1888. The Dedham Infirmary, also known as the Poor Farm, built a home on Elm Street in 1898. It closed in February 1954.

The Dedham Water Company was chartered in 1882. Gas streetlights were introduced in 1869 and were followed by electric lights in 1890.

The first police officers were appointed in 1876 and worked each day from 4 p.m. to 2 a.m. The police department was originally housed on the first floor of Memorial Hall.

Fire Department
A fire truck made by Paul Revere was purchased by a group of citizens and donated to the Town in 1800 as "a public utility and a very great security against the calamities of fire." It was known as Hero No. 1. It was stationed at the Connecticut Corner firehouse. A second hand tub, the Good Intent No. 2, was purchased in 1802 and stationed in the central village. The third engine, the Enterprise, was purchased in 1826.

In 1831, Town Meeting purchased eight more engines, including the Niagara and Water Witch. These two, together with the Hero, Good Intent, and Enterprise, were all located in the First Parish. The first steam engine was purchased in 1872.

Each engine had its own company of men attached to it and keen was the rivalry existing between the organizations. The Norfolk House was often selected for the annual meetings and dinners of the different companies for the next 40 years.

A firehouse in East Dedham was constructed in 1846 on Milton Street near the Old Stone Mill. It was used until 1897, when the firehouse on Bussey Street was constructed. Hose Number 3 was purchased by the town for the Milton Street station in 1891 and then moved to the Bussey Street location. That building also housed a supply wagon.

The central fire house was built at the corner of Washington and Bryant Streets. It housed Steamer Number 1, Hose Number 1, and Hook and Ladder Number 1. Both Hose Number 1, which carried 1,000' of hose, and Hook and Ladder Number 1, were drawn by two horses.

Selectmen

Town Clerks

New courthouse

When it became apparent that the old County Courthouse was out of date, the Norfolk County Commissioners ordered a new one to be built. They originally were seeking a utilitarian building that would be fireproof and safe to store important documents. Local boosters, however, wanted a building that aligned with the town's rapidly improving self-image. The commissioners were persuaded that

something more was required... than what was barely necessary; that... the state of this County, rapidly advancing in wealth and prosperity, required a liberal and judiciously expenditure for public accommodation, and that acquiring a taste for the fine arts was intimately connected with a refinement of manners and even with moral sentiment; that a magnificent temple of Justice would inspire an elevation of mind and contribute to cherish those feelings of reverence for the administration of the laws which it is so desirable to cultivate in a free community; the as the situation was in the most handsome and conspicuous place in the town, the building should be made in accordance with the architectural spirit of the times and comporting with the dignity and taste of the citizens of the County. 

The land for the courthouse, across the street from the existing one, was purchased from Frances Ames for $1,200. Masonic ceremonies, bell ringing and cannon fire accompanied the laying of the cornerstone on July 4, 1825. It was designed by Solomon Willard and built in the Greek style with pillared porticoes. Construction was completed in February 1827.

From the outside, it was an attractive building, but it was not a comfortable place to work. The only water was provided by a well on Court Street, and it did not have an adequate heating system. One employee complained that it was "barren and destitute of every convenience, demanded for health, comfort and decency."

Renovations in 1854 added gas lights to the building and running water from an on-site well. Six years later, in 1860, the building was fireproofed to protect county records. A group of citizens petitioned the commissioners, asking them not to make any structural changes for fear of ruining the exterior aesthetics of the building. Despite this, the Commission decided to extend the north front of the building, to add wings on either side, and add a large dome to the roof. Following plans developed by Gridley J. F. Bryant, the building was enlarged again between 1892 and 1895 to its present H-shaped configuration, adding wings to the southern facade that matched those added in 1863 to the north.

The old courthouse eventually became Temperance Hall.

First townhouse
After the new courthouse was constructed in 1827, the old courthouse was sold to Harris Monroe and Erastus Worthington. The pair speculated that the Town may want to use it as a town hall, and so they dragged it south down Court Street to a new lot. The Town decided to build an entirely new structure, however, on Bullard Street in 1828. By 1858, however, a town committee was complaining that "the present town house is neither in location, size, or style, sufficient to meet the reasonable requirements of the town." It was too far away from the center village and too ugly they said, and though there were over 1,000 voters in the town the building could not accommodate more than 275. Town meetings were frequently crowded and confused in the townhouse, and it was difficult to hear speakers and determine votes.

Memorial Hall

A committee decided that the first town hall was inadequate, but it remained standing for an additional eight years. Eventually, in 1867, it was decided that a new building should be erected to both house the town offices and to memorialize those who died in the Civil War. The firm of Ware and Van Brunt was hired to design the building, and they produced a "supremely Victorian plan" that recalled the "provincial town halls of England in outline and design."

Though Town Meeting had appropriated virtually unlimited funds for the project, a town committee tried to save money by cutting out several elements. The changes left it with a slightly unfinished appearance from the outside and an interior "utterly barren of all decent conveniences." It was described as Dedham's "monument alike to her dead soldiers and to living stupidity."

Brookdale Cemetery
For nearly 250 years after it was established, Old Village Cemetery was the only cemetery in Dedham. Seeing a need for greater space, the Annual Town Meeting of 1876 established a committee to look into establishing a new cemetery. Town Meeting accepted the committee's recommendation on October 20, 1877, and appropriated $8,150 to purchase more than 39 acres of land to establish Brookdale Cemetery.

Dedham High School

As early as 1827, the Commonwealth of Massachusetts required all towns with more than 500 families to establish a free public high school. Beginning in 1844, the School Committee repeatedly began recommending that the town establish a high school. It was not until 1850 when, under threat of a lawsuit, that the town meeting voted to "instruct the Town's School Committee to hire a building and teacher, and establish a High School according to law." A sum of $3,000 was appropriated to support it.

The new school was opened on September 15, 1851 with 42 students. Charles J. Capen, a private high school teacher, was hired to teach at the new school, and his classroom above the Masonic Hall was rented by the town. The building, located at 25 Church Street, was previously Miss Emily Hodge's Private School. The school used this space from 1851 to 1854, at which point it was moved to the Town House on Bullard Street. In 1855, a new school was built on Highland Street and dedicated on December 10. A new school was built on Bryant Street in 1887, and students moved in on October 3.

Representation in the General Court

Churches
In 1807, Nathaniel Ames discovered the Town was using the taxes he paid for the support of the church to pay the First Church's minister, and not his new Anglican church minister. The tax collector told him it was a bad law and refused to follow it, which prompted Ames to retort that he was as big of a tyrant as Napoleon Bonaparte.

First Church
Votes were taken in 1805 and 1807 to expand the meetinghouse, but nothing came from either effort.

Seeing the success the Anglican Church down the street had renting out land, First Church began renting out lots around the meetinghouse around the turn of the 19th century.

Ministers

As the years went on, Rev. Jason Haven's mental and physical condition continued to decline. He was frequently so beset with fevers, migraines, and coughing spells that he could not get out of bed. The prospect of hiring an assistant or a replacement was brought up time and again at parish meetings, but without a decision ever being made. Finally, Rev. Joshua Bates, a recent Harvard College graduate, was called to serve as associate pastor in April 1802. Fisher Ames served on the search committee, helping to explain why a Federalist minister was called to serve a congregation that was Democratic Republican by a ratio of 3 to 1.

Three months later, Haven died. On December 30, 1802, the parish met and debated whether or not Bates should be afforded the traditional lifetime contract. Nathaniel Ames, noting how unpopular Haven had become over the years, advocated for a trial period first. Fisher Ames made an eloquent speech of support and this was enough to issue a call. As a result, several members, including Nathaniel, left the church and became Episcopalians.

Bates was ordained on March 16, 1803 "before a very crowded, but a remarkably civil and brilliant assembly." The opposition to Bates was so intense that it seems some, including the newspapers, expected there to be some sort of protest at his ordination, but nothing ever materialized.

During his pastorate, the Lord's Supper was administered every six weeks. On the Thursdays preceding, he would preach the Preparatory Lecture. Students in the nearby school were marched to the meetinghouse to listen to the lecture, and Bates would visit the school on Mondays to quiz students on the catechism.

Politically, he was an ardent Federalist while the town and the church were strongly anti-Federalist. Though he was not as liberal as some had hoped, his sermons often were intolerant of those whose politics who differed from his own and were not well received. He believed Thomas Jefferson to be an infidel and that his followers were, at best, doubtful Christians. He was a "high-toned Calvinist school," and he was not particularly charitable towards those of other denominations. He also demonstrated a sense of superiority over his own flock. By 1808, even Fisher Ames would have enough with Bates and would join Dedham's Anglican church.

Just after midnight on the Fourth of July, 1809, a group of Republicans dragged the old town cannon to just below Bates' bedroom window. They stuffed it with sod from his lawn and were about to set it off when Bates appeared in his nightshirt. Not recognizing him immediately, one celebrant yelled "Get out of the way, you old bugger, or you'll get your brains blown out!" Bates and his bucket of water convinced the crowd to leave, but they soon returned. They fired the cannon, which was more than 150 years old, and awoke Bates again to the sound of shattering windowpanes.

Several years later, the entire choir resigned, en masse. It is not clear why from the records, but Bates missed them and worked to get them back.

In 1818 he asked to be dismissed from the church to accept the presidency of Middlebury College. It is assumed that, due to his differing political beliefs and his politically tinged sermons, that many in the congregation were glad to let him go. His last sermon was delivered February 5, 1818. He was later go on to become Chaplain of the United States House of Representatives.

Split at First Church

The First Church and Parish in Dedham split in 1818 over a dispute about who should become the next minister. At the time, all Massachusetts towns were Constitutionally required to tax their citizens "for the institution of the public worship of God, and for the support and maintenance of public Protestant teachers of piety."  All residents of a town were assessed, as members of the parish, whether or not they were also members of the church.  The "previous and long standing practice [was to have] the church vote for the minister and the parish sanction this vote."

In 1818, "Dedham [claimed] rights distinct from the church and against the vote of the church."  The town, as the parish, selected a liberal Unitarian minister, Rev. Alvan Lamson, to serve the First Church in Dedham.  The members of the church were more traditional and rejected Lamson by a vote of 18–14.  When the parish installed and ordained Lamson the majority of the Church left "with Deacon [Samuel] Fales who took parish records, funds and silver with him."  The parish, along with the members of the church who remained, installed their own deacons and sued to reclaim the church property.

With the Congregational Church established as the state religion in Massachusetts at the time, the dispute eventually reached the Massachusetts Supreme Judicial Court. The court ruled that "[w]hatever the usage in settling ministers, the Bill of Rights of 1780 secures to towns, not to churches, the right to elect the minister, in the last resort." The case was a major milestone in the road towards the separation of church and state and led to the Commonwealth formally disestablishing the Congregational Church in 1833.

The breakaway members formed the Allin Congregational Church across the street from the First Church. The remaining members of First Church renovated their meetinghouse and moved the front door to face the church green, and away from the Allin Church in 1820. In 1888, on the 250th anniversary of the church, a joint service was held in First Church in the afternoon, followed by a social reunion, and then a second service at the Allin church.

Episcopal churches

St. Paul's

In 1791, the congregation regrouped after the American Revolution and called William Montague away from Old North Church. Montague received a salary of £100 sterling. He remained in the Dedham church until 1818.

When the church began leasing out land, it offered a flat rate for the first seven years which would then be adjusted for the subsequent years. Many of the tenants refused to pay the increases, however, and the church evicted them.

The 1798 Episcopal church in Franklin Square was replaced by a new building at the corner of Court Street and Village Ave. It was 90' long and had a bell tower in front that was 100' high. The builders, Thomas and Nathan Phillips, were from Dedham. Designed by Arthur Gilman after Magdalen College, Oxford, it was consecrated in 1845 but burned down in 1856.

The fourth church was completed in 1858 with a bell tower added in 1869. The bell was donated by Ira Cleveland. One minister, Rev. Samuel B. Babcock, served as rector in three buildings from 1834 to 1873. A chapel was added later, built with a bequest from George E. Hutton.

Good Shepherd
Lay readers from St. Paul's began ministering to Episcopalians in the Oakdale section of town in 1873 who could not get to the church easily. Out of their efforts grew the Church of the Good Shepard, which was dedicated in 1876. One of the early members was William B. Gould.

St. Mary's

In 1843, 85 years after the Acadians arrived, the first Catholic Mass was said in Daniel Slattery's home where the police station now stands in Dedham Square.  For the next three years after that first Mass with eight Catholics present, John Dagget, Slattery's brother in law, would drive to Waltham each Sunday and bring Father James Strain to Dedham to say Mass.  In 1846 Dedham became part of the mission of St. Jospeph's Church in Roxbury and Father Patrick O'Beirne would celebrate Mass in Temperance Hall.

Large number of Irish immigrants fled the Great Famine a few years later and many of them settled in Dedham.  By 1857 so many had settled that Father O'Beirne built the first Catholic church in Dedham, St Mary's Parish.  When the Civil War broke out in 1861 Dedham men from all religious persuasions responded to the call but "no church in Dedham lost so many men in proportion to their numbers" as St. Mary's did.  In 1880 the current church was built on High Street, next to the rectory that had been purchased three years earlier.  Thousands attend the laying of the cornerstone by Archbishop John J. Williams and a special train was run from Boston to accommodate all those who wished to be present.  The master of ceremonies was Fr. Theodore A. Metcalf, a descendant of Michaell Metcalfe, the teacher. Theodore Metcalf may also have been a descendant of Jonathon Fairbanks.  At the time St. Mary's, "a fine stone church at a cost of about $125,000" was completed there was a Methodist, two Baptist, two Congregationalist, two Unitarian, and two Episcopal churches in Dedham.

It was also in 1880 that the Town Meeting set aside of the town cemetery, Brookdale, for Catholics to be buried in.  The following year two Protestant businessmen gave great financial support to the fledgling parish.  John R. Bullard contributed the Dedham granite used to construct the great upper church.  Albert W. Nickerson paid off the debt still remaining on the old church and contributed $10,000 to help complete the new one.

Other
Beginning in 1818, itinerant Methodist ministers held services in private homes in Dedham. The first resident pastor, Rev. Joseph Pond, arrived in 1842 and a church was completed in 1843 on Milton Street near the intersection with Walnut Street.

The first Baptist church was opened in 1843 near Maverick Street, but meetings had been held for years prior beginning in 1822. A new church was built at the corner of Milton and Myrtle Streets in 1852. Rev. Calvin Durfee was minister of the South Parish in 1836 and Rev. John White was at the West Parish.

Over the course of his career, William H. Mann was the  organist at St. Paul's, the First Church and Parish in Dedham, and at the Baptist Church in East Dedham.

Residents

Population
The population of Dedham has grown more than 10 times since 1793, reaching its peak around the year 1980.

New Dedhamites
In 1800 Colburn Gay of Dedham wished to marry Sarah Ellis of Walpole.  The laws at the time said that a wedding must take place in the town of the bride, however Gay insisted that Rev. Thomas Thatcher preside.  Thatcher was the minister in Dedham's third parish, however, and could not officiate outside of the town's borders.  To resolve this dilemma the couple stood on the Walpole side of Bubbling Brook, and Thatcher stood on the Dedham side.  They were married across the stream and had two children before Sarah died in 1810.

Albert W. Nickerson first arrived in Dedham in 1877.  He was the president of Arlington Mills in Lawrence and director of the Atchison, Topeka and Santa Fe Railway and built a home near Connecticut Corner where he "took an active part in community affairs and made generous donations to charitable causes."  He sold the house to his brother George when he had a dispute with the town over taxes and improvements he wished to make to the property a few years later and moved to an estate on Buzzards Bay.  Nickerson entertained President Grover Cleveland here and helped convince him to purchase the adjoining estate Grey Gables.

Several years later he bought another parcel in Dedham, this time a  estate on the Charles known as Riverdale.  The estate was the boyhood home of ambassador and historian John Lothrop Motley.  In 1886, he commission the architectural firm of Henry Hobson Richardson to build him a castle on the estate and hired Frederick Law Olmsted's firm to do the landscaping.  The castle has a number of interesting architectural elements but its most famous is by far its numerous secret passages and "legendary underground mazes and hallways."  It was built on top of a rocky hill "so that the Castle and the River appeared magically to carriages or cars arriving through the forested Pine Street entrance."

During the 1800s Dedham became the summer home of many wealthy Bostonians and, with the Industrial Revolution, many immigrants to the United States. One of the new residents of Dedham was Horace Mann, who lived for several years at the Norfolk House and opened a law office in December 1823.  He soon "became interested in town affairs, was often chosen Moderator of the town meetings, and was an early candidate for office."  Mann served as Dedham's Representative in General Court from 1827 to 1832 as well as on the School Committee.  In only his first year in Dedham he was invited to deliver the Independence Day address.  In his speech he "outlined for the first time the basic principles that he would return to in his subsequent public statements, arguing that education, intelligent use of the elective franchise, and religious freedom are the means by which American liberties are preserved."  Former President and then Congressman John Quincy Adams later read the address and "expressed great confidence in the future career of Mr. Mann."

In 1847, a successful dry-goods merchant in Boston moved to Dedham with his wife. Charles Brown and Mary Patterson Shaw built a home at the corner of East Street and Auburn Street, modern day Whiting Avenue. It was described as "one of the most commanding positions in the town." At a cost of $18,264, it was one of the most expensive home in the Greater Boston area. After Mary died in 1886, it was purchased by the Boston Children's Friend Society as a home for boys.

The population grew dramatically in the 19th century, largely by immigrants seeking work in the mills along Mother Brook. The largest group, comprising 75% of new arrivals, were the Irish who fled the Great Famine. The second largest group were Germans who moved to the area in large numbers beginning in the 1850s. Later in the century, large numbers of Italians and Eastern Europeans moved to Dedham. The immigrants were overwhelmingly Catholic.

Race and ethnicity
In the mid-1800s, there were only a few non-white families in town. One student remembers only two black classmates at the Centre School during this time: Sara Robbins, the daughter or granddaughter of Seth Robbins, and Sam Johnson, the grandson of Mott Johnson. There was also only one Irish student, Patrick "Pat Slat" Slattery.

A black family lived at the corner of Washington Street and Wilson's Lane (modern day Worthington Street). The father was a whitewasher and was assisted by his son, who also had a great musical talent. They were very social with the boys of the neighborhood, although practical jokes were played on the family, including lighting a quantity of gunpowder placed under one of their beds on the morning of the Fourth of July.

Neighborhoods were often segregated by national origin. In the area between Bussey and Washington Streets, the Germans congregated on Shiller Road and Goethe Street. Many Irish lived on Maverick, Colburn, and Curve streets. Curve Street also had a number of Canadians. An Irish immigrant, who lived at 27 Myrtle Street from 1872 to 1907, rose from working in the woolen mills to becoming Superintendent of Streets and then eventually a deal estate developer. He both rented and sold many homes in the Hill Avenue area to fellow Irish immigrants.

William Gould

On September 21, 1862, a slave plasterer working on an antebellum mansion in Wilmington, North Carolina named William B. Gould escaped with seven other slaves.  They rowed a small boat  down the Cape Fear River and out into the Atlantic Ocean where the USS Cambridge of the North Atlantic Blockading Squadron picked them up as contraband.  Gould joined the U.S. Navy and believed he was "defending the holiest of all causes, Liberty and Union."  Beginning with his time on the Cambridge and continuing through his discharge at the end of the war he kept a diary of his day-to-day activities.  In it he chronicles his trips to the northeastern U.S. to Holland, Belgium, Spain, Portugal and England.

After he was discharged from the Navy at the Charlestown Navy Yard he married Cornelia Read in November 1865.  Cornelia was a former slave who was then living on Nantucket and they corresponded throughout the war.  The Goulds moved to Milton Street and together they had two daughters and six sons. In Dedham Gould "became a building contractor and community pillar."

Gould "took great pride in his work" when he resumed work as a plasterer and helped to build the new St. Mary's Church.  One of his employees improperly mixed the plaster and even though it was not visible by looking at it, Gould insisted that it be removed and reapplied correctly.  Gould helped to build the Episcopal Church of the Good Shepard in Oakdale Square, though as a parishioner and not as a contractor.  It may have been the Episcopal church he attended in Wilmington as a slave that taught him to read and write, and thus to be able to keep his diary.

Gould was extremely active in the Grand Army of the Republic's Charles W. Carroll Post 144.  He "held virtually every position that it was possible to hold in the GAR from the time he joined [in 1882] until his death in 1923, including the highest post, commander, in 1900 and 1901."  Five of his sons fought in the First World War and one in the Spanish–American War.  A photo of the six sons and their father, all in military uniform, appeared in the NAACP's magazine, The Crisis, in December 1917.  Gould's great-grandson described them as "a family of fighters."

When he died in 1923 at the age of 85 he was interred at Brookdale Cemetery.  The Dedham Transcript reported his death under the headline “East Dedham Mourns Faithful Soldier and Always Loyal Citizen: Death Came Very Suddenly to William B. Gould, Veteran of the Civil War.”

The Fairbanks case

The first major trial to be held at the new courthouse was that of Jason Fairbanks.  He was courting Elizabeth Fales and the two carried on a "desultory and somewhat ambiguous relationship" marked by Fales' parents' disapproval, Fairbanks' poor health, and Fales continually breaking up with Fairbanks and then taking him back again. Fairbanks had told a friend that "planned to meet Betsey, in order to have the matter settled" and that he "either intended to violate her chastity, or carry her to Wrentham, to be married, for he had waited long enough."  On May 18, 1801, Fales met Fairbanks in a "birch grove next to 'Mason's Pasture'" and told him that she could not marry him.

Fales was stabbed 11 times, including once in the back, and her throat was slashed. Fairbanks staggered to her home, covered in blood, and told her family that she had committed suicide. He also told them that he had also attempted to take his own life, but was unable to, and that accounted for his wounds which left him "still alive, but in a most deplorable situation." Fairbanks was too injured to be moved, and was left to recuperate at the Fales' home. He did not attend Fales' funeral, but 2,000 others did, probably making it the largest crowd ever assembled in Dedham.

Fairbanks was arraigned on August 5, 1801, and the trial opened on the 6th. Interest in the case involving two prominent families was so great that the trial was moved to the First Parish Meetinghouse across the street. When that venue proved to still be too small, the trial again moved to the Town Common. The defense told the jury that, due to a smallpox vaccination that ended up harming him, Fairbanks did not have the use of his right arm and was sickly in general. They suggested, though Fairbanks later strongly denied it, that the lovers had a murder-suicide pact. The trial concluded on the evening on August 7. The next day, August 8, the jury found him guilty and he was sentenced to death.

On the night of August 17, Fairbanks escaped from jail along with several others. A $1,000 bounty offered for his capture. The murder, trial, and the escape set off a media firestorm. Fairbanks was captured in Skeensborough, New York while waiting for a steamer to bring him to Canada. Fairbanks was not returned to Dedham, the site of his previous escape, but was instead brought to the Suffolk County Jail in Boston.

On September 10, 1801, he was returned to Dedham from the Boston jail and was hanged. In addition to a military presence to ensure he didn't escape again, "the 10,000 people who showed up at the Town Common to witness the execution were five times the town's population at the time." One resident counted 711 carriages driving down Spring Street towards the gallows that morning. It set a new record for the largest crowd in Dedham.

Within days of the execution the first of four installments of the Report of the Trial of Jason Fairbanks was published by the Boston firm Russell and Cutler. It was 87 pages long and was issued over the course of several months, making it "the first demonstrably popular trial report published in early national New England."  A number of books and pamphlets were written about the case in the months and years to come including "one of the earliest novels based on an actual murder case," the Life of Jason Fairbanks: A Novel Founded on Fact.

Organizations
The Norfolk House was also the site where "on June 4, 1810, in an expression of public outrage, a number of Dedham citizens assembled" and founded the Society in Dedham for Apprehending Horse Thieves. Today the "Society is the oldest continually existing horse thief apprehending organization in the United States, and one of Dedham's most venerable social organizations."

A Masonic lodge opened in 1803.

Economy
Early in the 19th century Dedham become a transportation hub and the "existence of quick freight service promoted a burst of industrial development."  By the 200th anniversary of the town's incorporation in 1836, Dedham was "a thriving commercial and manufacturing center."  Within 50 years of the railroads' arrival in 1836, the population almost doubled to 6,641.

Industry

With the arrival of railroads in 1831, Dedham became an attractive location for manufacturing. By 1837, the mills and factories in town were producing cotton and woolen goods, leather, boots, shoes, paper, marbled paper,  iron castings, chairs, cabinet wares, straw bonnets, palm-leaf hats, and silk goods.  Together they were worth $510,755 with the silk goods alone worth $10,000.

A silk factory opened on Eastern Ave in 1836 but burned down on March 11, 1845. In later years it became a dye house, a laundry, and a playing card factory. By 1880, the site had become home to the C.D. Brooks Chocolate Factory. On March 28, 1845, the Ashcroft Calico Works burned down.

There were more than 500 people employed in local industries in 1845. That year there were two cotton mills, a silk factory, a furnace foundry, a shovel works, three woolen mills, a paper factory, two tanneries, eight woodworking factories, a cotton thread factory, two iron and tin works, four coach manufacturers, and a number of smaller businesses producing boots, shoes, saddles, harnesses, cigars, marbled paper, pocket books, and headwear. The marbled paper manufactory, S.C. & E Mann, was located on the south side of High Street between Court and Pearl Streets.

Frederick L. Bestwick, the harness maker, lived on School Street just east of the Centre School with his nephew, Albert. After Joel Richard's died, Aaron Marden and Henry Curtis opened up a planing mill and sawing business in this first floor of the Richards' shop.

Major Jacob Clark was a building contractor who later became a millwright, setting up water-wheels at mills around New England and the maritime provinces before the advent of the steam engine. Clark lived on Federal Hill and his factory was powered by horses who walked in a circle and powered a large gear overhead. Most of the waterwheels in use at the time, including those on Mother Brook, were overshot wheels. Clarke also built the Allin Congregational Church.

After Clark's death in 1837, his partner, Edward B. Holmes, continued the wheelwright business. In 1846, Thomas Dunbar, who had been their apprentice, became Holmes' partner. They moved the shop from Federal Hill to an old paper mill on High Street near East Street. The building was across the street from the train tracks in a building connected to a blacksmith shop. In the basement was a stationary engine of a peculiar design. In the lower story were circular saws, lathes, and planers. On the floor that was level with the train tracks was iron work machinery. The pair then moved to an unused building near the old stone depot on Mother Brook where they used steam power.

Sumner Wilson had a carpenter shop on Wilson's Lane where the saws and lathes were run by horsepower. He later built a two family rental house next door. A carriage manufacturing and painting shop owned by Elisha McIntosh was located on Court Street and a blacksmith was located in the rear.

With the Industrial Revolution, Dedham experienced the ups and downs of a national economy.

Dedham Pottery

Hugh C. Robertson moved the Dedham Pottery plant from Chelsea to Dedham in 1896. The architect of the building, who also served on the company's board, was Alexander Wadsworth Longfellow Jr. The plant, which rarely if ever employed more than six people at a time, was located on Pottery Lane, off High Street, where the 2012 Avery School stands. The company closed in 1942 and the building burned to the ground in the 1970s. Maude Davenport, who was raised on Greenlodge Street in Dedham, is regarded as the company's most skilled decorator.

Roads
Turnpikes, including the South Road, linking Boston and Providence, and the Middle Road, linking Dedham and Hartford, were laid through town during the first few years of the 19th century.

In 1802, Fisher Ames and a group of others requested that the Great and General Court lay out a new turnpike between the Norfolk County Courthouse and Pawtucket. Dedham's representative, Ebenezer Fisher, voted no, but the Norfolk and Bristol Turnpike was chartered on March 8, 1802. Nathaniel Ames was incensed and believed FIsher's no vote made him a "traitor" motivated by "an ancient prejudice against the Old Parish." At the following May's election, the issue of turnpikes was a greater driver of participation than political party. Those from the outlying parts of town attended in large numbers to support Representative Fisher and his opposition to the turnpike.

The Norfolk and Bristol Turnpike created modern day Washington Street from High Street in Dedham Square to the Roxbury line. It then turned west to Court Street, where it ran south to Washington Street, and then straight to Pawtucket.

Edward L. Penniman laid out Mt. Auburn Street (modern day Whiting Avenue) and Mt. Vernon Street through his own property. The Town named the intersection of those two streets Penniman Square, but Penniman died the same day and never learned of the honor.

Jeremiah Shuttleworth leased a lot of land from St. Paul's Church at the corner of Church and High Streets. The minister, William Montague, referred to the intersection as "Jere Square" in his honor.

Modern day Worthington Street was known in the 19th century as Wilson's Lane. Dwight's bridge over Wigwam Creek stood at the intersection of High and East Streets. Lyons Street  is named for a 19th-century landowner, Elisha Lyon. Lyon lived on the Needham side of the Charles River. There has been a bridge on the site since the 1740s, but the current bridge was built in 1879. Lyons Street originally ran as far as Common Street but was cut short and dead ended when Route 128 was built.

Railroads

Within a few decades of the turnpikes' arrival, railroad beds were laid through Dedham.  The railroad was at first "considered dangerous.  It was new fangled.  People didn't trust it, so they wouldn't ride it.  Only a very few brave souls in those opening years" ever boarded one. This fear was short lived, however as the first rail line came in 1836 and by 1842 locomotives had put the stagecoach lines out of business.  The first line was a branch connecting Dedham Square to the main Boston-Providence line in Readville.  In 1848 the Norfolk County Railroad connected Dedham and Walpole and in 1854 the Boston and New York Central ran through town.

The train bridge over Wigwam Creek, near the intersection of East and High Streets, had a red roof. Mrs. Hutchins' boarding house was next door. In 1886, the railroad built a new bridge over High Street and placed a granite plaque there to commemorate both the new bridge and the 250th anniversary of the town's incorporation.  The plaque was removed sometime thereafter and ended up in the woods near railroad tracks in Sharon.  It has since been returned to Dedham.

In 1881 the Boston and Providence Railroad company built a station in Dedham Square out of Dedham Granite.  There were more than 60 trains a day running to it in its heyday, but it was demolished in 1951 and the stones were used to build an addition to the main branch of the Dedham Public Library.

Moses Boyd was the "well-known and gentlemanly" conductor of the Dedham branch of the Providence Railroad.  At a party for his 25th wedding anniversary his passengers presented him with gifts of cash that totaled between $600 and $700.  In addition to the passengers from Dedham, West Roxbury and Jamaica Plain, the President and Superintendent of the railroad attended the party at his home and presented him with a silver plate.

Connecticut Corner

In 1800, a group of tinsmiths from Connecticut, including Calvin Whiting and Eli Parsons, began a business at the corner of Lowder and High Streets. They attracted additional businesses, including a dry good store. The area became known as Connecticut Corner. In 1833, the Russel and Baker furniture company moved into the area but, after two bad fires, moved downtown in 1853. It employed 500 people.

Banks
The Dedham Bank was founded in Dedham in 1814 and asked Nathaniel Ames to be a director. Ames declined, citing the large number of lawyers involved with its creation. Ten months after creation, however, the bank had 66 shareholders in Dedham, Boston, Bellingham, Medway, Dover, Walpole, Franklin, Needham, Woburn, Roxbury, Medfield, Sharon, Wrentham, Hopkington, Bridgewater, Canton, and Sherburne. There was an attempted burglary of the Dedham Bank in 1863 with the would-be thieves using gunpowder.

The two major banks at the end of the century were the Dedham National Bank, with over $300,000 in capital, and the Dedham Institution for Savings, with more than $2,000,000 in deposits.

Retail shops
A grocery store stood in the middle part of the century at the corner of School and Washington Streets. It was owned by Austin Bryant, the Town's treasurer and tax collector. Bryant sold the store to Horatio Clarke in 1845, and in 1847 it was sold again William H. Mason. Mason owned it until his death, at which point it was taken over by Merrill D. Ellis. Enoch Sutton, the watchmaker, owned the next house south on Washington Street. Another grocery store opened on the first floor of the S.C. & E. Manufactory on High Street and there was a slaughterhouse on Eastern Ave near the railroad station.

Andrew Wiggin's shoe store was on the corner of High Street and Washington Street. At the same corner was a tailor and Mason Richard's dry goods store.

A Mr. Eaton was the lumber dealer. A millinery store was located under Temperance Hall. Erastus Shumway owned a stove and tinshop on School Street. He later moved the shop to Court Street on the first floor of the Independent Order of Odd Fellows building. Next door lived Ambrose Galucia, a house painter.

Around the corner on Franklin Square was the home of Joseph Guild, the hardware dealer. Nathaniel Hewins was the Town's baker, and he employed a Mr. Sawin, Bestwick's neighbor. Hewins bakery, which adjoined his residence, faced Franklin Square.

On Court Street, near the intersection with Church Street, was a fish market and restaurant. The owner, Warren "Oyster" Fisher, lived next door in a house where a number of people boarded. A few doors down was a bakery.

On Church Street, near the intersection with Norfolk Street, was William Field's dry good store. Above the store was the original location of Dedham High School. Just north of the school was Mr. Packard's stove store. Next door was a hat making shop owned by Timothy Phelps. In the back, Phelps had a bathing establishment that offered both hot and cold baths.

Just north on Church Street was a barber shop owned by Amory "Barber" Fisher who later owned and an ice and coal business. Further up the street was the home and paint shop of John Cox. Next to the Cox home was Nancy Damon's store that sold "thread, ribbons, silks, and fancy goods." It was previously located across the street from the Norfolk House.

At the corner of Washington and High Streets, where the police station sits in 2021, was a number of buildings owned by Charles Coolidge. Those buildings "were rented by a class of people, especially in the rear, that made the whole locality an eyesore in the heart of the village." At the corner was Coolidge's book and newspaper store, a tailor by the name of Lynch, and another store that sold secretly sold liquor. Memorial Hall was later built on the site.

Medical
In 1819, George Dixon bought the land at 601-603 High Street and built a home there. In the ell of the house was an apothecary shop that sold products produced by Dedham's Wheaton & Dixon. After Dixon's death, an apothecary named Tower took over the shop. When Tower was named postmaster, George Marsh, who had attended the Dedham Public Schools, then became the village apothecary. Marsh had learned the trade at a chemist's store on Cambridge Street in Boston.

Jesse Wheaton, a doctor in the town, opened an apothecary shop on High Street. In the shop he employed his nephew, Jesse Talbot. Wheaton lived on the south side of Court Street and was one of the oldest residents in Dedham. He also hired Lemuel Thwing to sell his patent medicines, including Wheaton's Itch Ointment, Lee's Bilious Pills, Dumfrey's Eye Water, Godfrey's Cordial, and Godfrey's Bone Liniment, around New England and Canada in a large wagon with "Itch Ointment and Others" emblazoned on the side.

Jeremy Stimson was a family physician and president of the Dedham Bank who lived on High Street. Doctor Samuel Stillman Whitney lived in Franklin Square and later sold his house to Dr. J.P. Maynard. Maynard also lived in a house just to the west of what is today 601-603 High Street. Maynard invented a forerunner to the Band-Aid.

Agriculture
In 1888, the 97 farms in town produced a product valued at $5,273,965, up from only $192,294 in 1885.

Other

On Ames Street in the mid-19th century near High Street was a long building that housed a number of lawyers, with their signs adorning the exterior. Two houses down from the Centre School lived Jeremiah Radford, who cared for both the Norfolk County Courthouse and St. Paul's Church. Daniel Marsh was a mason.

The town's 1889 directory lists 10 blacksmiths, six boarding houses, five hotels, two ice dealers, 17 grocers, seven physicians and surgeons, four lawyers, 17 dressmakers, and one dentist. The products produced in town that year included boots, cabinets, chocolate, carriages, cigars, dresses, harnesses, slippers, suspenders, soap, tools, watches, and whips. 
 
After the Columbian Minerva, the Norfolk Repository began covering the news of Dedham. Both were published by Herman Mann. It was followed by the Dedham Gazette, published by Jabez Chickering with Theron Metcalf as editor. There were two weekly newspapers, the Dedham Standard and the Dedham Transcript. The Norfolk Democrat was published by Elbridge G. Robinson.

In the 1800s many Dedham men, constrained by the growing population and the scarcity of land, left Dedham for the Ohio Country. They could thank, in part, Manasseh Cutler, a former Dedham resident and the son-in-law of South Dedham's Minister, Thomas Balch, who convinced Congress to approve a plantation there.

The town pump was located at the head of Franklin Square. It was made of wood painted green with an iron handle. Two lots over was an octagonal building with a large circular reservoir inside fed by the Federal Hill spring. The cistern was filled with hay in the winter to keep it from freezing and then emptied each spring. It was later taken down and rebuilt as a residence near Stone Haven station.

Taverns

Inns and taverns sprung up along the new roads as more than 600 coaches would pass through Dedham each day on their way to Boston or Providence.  The stable behind Gay's Tavern could hold over 100 horses and eight horse teams could be switched within two minutes. Gay's Tavern was out of business by 1810. The Ames Tavern closed after the death of its last operator, Deborah Woodward, and was demolished in 1817.

Norfolk House

In 1802, a local mason named Martin Marsh built his brick home at what is today 19 Court Street and was then right on one of the new turnpikes. Marsh rented the land from the First Church and Parish in Dedham. He saw the traffic flowing daily past his house and quickly turned his home into a tavern, opening by August 12, 1805 His establishment, the Norfolk House, like the other inns and taverns in Dedham at that time, were bustling with the arrival of both the turnpikes and the courts. He maintained the tavern until 1818, and then sold it to Moses Gray and Francis Alden.On the north side of Court Street was a building called the "Flat Iron Building" due to its wedge-like shape. It was this partnership that hosted President Andrew Jackson for lunch as he and his entourage passed through town in 1832.

The Norfolk House was also a hotbed for Republican politics in its day. A young Congressman named Abraham Lincoln gave a speech at the Norfolk House on September 20, 1848, while in Massachusetts to campaign for Zachary Taylor.  He appeared uncomfortable as he arrived but

His indifferent manner vanished as soon as he opened his mouth.  He went right to work. He turned up the cuffs of his shirt.  Next, he loosened his necktie, and soon after it he took it off altogether.  All the time, he was gaining upon his audience.  He soon had it as by a spell.  I never saw men more delighted.  He began to bubble out with humor.  For plain pungency of humor, it would have been difficult to surpass his speech.  The speech ended in a half-hour.  The bell that called to the steam cars sounded.  Mr. Lincoln instantly stopped.  ‘I am engaged to speak at Cambridge tonight, and I must leave.’  The whole audience seemed to rise in protest.  ‘Go on!  Finish it!’ was heard on every hand.  One gentleman arose and pledged to take his horse and carry him across country.  But Mr. Lincoln was inexorable.

Phoenix Hotel

The Phoenix Hotel was one of the most popular social spots in Dedham during the 19th century. It was located on the northwest corner of the High Street-Washington Street intersection in modern-day Dedham Square. Among the distinguished guests of this hotel were Andrew Jackson and James Monroe.

When the Norfolk and Bristol Turnpike was opened in 1803, Timothy Gay leased a tavern directly on the new road. Gay was also the owner of the Citizen Stagecoach Line and, due to this, all of the stagecoaches traveling between Providence and Boston stopped at his tavern. Gay was out of business by 1810, but was then operated by a number of others who gave the business their name, including Calp, Smith, Polley, Alden, and Bride. John Bride was proprietor by 1832 and it was an attractive hotel that could handle the relay of horses and the needs of the many passengers who passed through each day. The 12 to 15 coaches that pulled up each day typically had seven or more people in each. The stable housed over 100 horses at any given time.  Teams of eight horses could be swapped out in two minutes.

Fires
Around two o'clock in the morning on October 30, 1832, a fire broke out in the stable and quickly traveled to the hotel, leveling both in 90 minutes. The fire killed 66 horses and one man, who was sleeping in the barn. It was assumed that the man, a veteran of the Revolution walking to Washington, D.C. to beg for a pension, was the cause of the fire. The veteran was buried at the local cemetery, and it took several days to cart all of the dead horses down to the marshes where their carcasses could be sunk into the mud.

Bride rebuilt the inn, naming it the Phoenix Hotel in honor of it rising from the ashes. It had four large parlors on the first floor in addition to a dining hall that measured 58' by 28' and a bar that was 38' by 18'. The second floor had six parlors and ten chambers, with a total of sixty guest rooms. The Norfolk Advertiser called it "a splendid new house, not surpassed in size, fixtures, or elegance of finish, by any in all the villages of Massachusetts." The stable was built adjacent to the hotel again, but this time a brick wall served as a firestop between the two.

Another fire broke out in the stables around 2:00 a.m. on January 7, 1834, just 15 months later. After the second fire, the stables were rebuilt further down Washington Street and away from the hotel. A third fire broke out on January 7, 1850. The hotel and other buildings in the area were emptied as a precaution, but the engine companies were able to keep the flames confined to the stable.

John Wade, a resident at the competing Norfolk House, got drunk one evening and mentioned that he knew something about the first fire. He was arrested within an hour and eventually confessed that he had been hired by the owner of the Norfolk House to light the first fire.

Wade was found guilty of both arson and murder and sentenced to death, but Rev. Ebenzer Burgess intervened on his behalf and helped get it communed to life imprisonment. The accused owner of the Norfolk House, which was a stop on the competing Tremont Stagecoach Line, committed suicide shortly after Wade named him. George Walton was later identified as the culprit in the second fire and was indicted, but he died of consumption in prison before he could be tried.

Rules of baseball
On May 13, 1858, members of the various town ball teams in the Boston area met at the Phoenix Hotel to form the Massachusetts Association of Baseball Players. The nine team association included three teams from Boston and one from Dedham.

The association developed a set of rules that came to be known as the Massachusetts Game. There were no foul balls, four bases in a rectangular shape, and games lasted until one team had scored 100 runs. At the end of the day, after they adopted 17 rules, they broke to play a game that was well attended by residents.

Later years

Under different names and different managers, the house continued to do a good business. John Howe and his wife owned the hotel from 1850 to 1879, during which time it became one of the community's leading social spots. During the Civil War, it was commonly frequented by officers from nearby Camp Meigs. After that it gained a reputation as a spa, where people from the city might escape for a few days.

Its last owner, Henry White, had owned it for only a year when it finally burned to the ground on the morning of December 25, 1880. It was the last tavern in Dedham at the time and, when it finally burned, Dedham's days of hosting stagecoach travelers ended.

Temperance Hall

The Temperance Hall Association, which was part of the temperance movement that opposed alcohol, purchased the old Norfolk County Courthouse in 1845. They extended the second floor by building an addition propped up by stilts that extended into the back yard. The Boy's Dedham Picnic Band often played before temperance rallies and other events.

The hall was rented out to a great number of organizations. Among the groups using the hall were ventriloquists, magicians, a painted panorama entitled "The Burning of Moscow," a glassblowing exhibition, a demonstration of a model volcano called "The Eruption of Vesuvius," plays, concerts, including one by the Mendelssohn String Quartet, lectures, fundraisers, debates, bell ringers, and marching sessions by a para-military drill club. Among the speakers who took the podium there were Theodore Parker, Oliver Wendell Holmes, Sr., Frederick Douglass, Horace Mann, Father Matthew, Abraham Lincoln, William R. Alger, and John Boyle O'Reilly.

By 1846, the Catholic community in Dedham was well established enough that the town became part of the mission of St. Joseph's Church in Roxbury. The flood of Irish immigrants escaping the Great Famine necessitated celebrating Mass in Temperance Hall, often by Father Patrick O'Beirne.

The building burned down on April 28, 1891.

Fenian raid
Following the Civil War, the local chapter of the Fenian Brotherhood, which had offices in the nearby Norfolk House, hosted a meeting in which a Fenian raid into Canada was organized. John R. Bullard, a recent Harvard Law School graduate, was elected moderator of the meeting and, having been swept up in his own sudden importance and fever of the meeting, ended his animated speech by asking "Who would be the first man to come forward and pledge himself to go to Canada and help free Ireland?" The first of the roughly dozen men to sign the "enlistment papers" were Patrick Donohoe and Thomas Golden. Thomas Brennan said he could not participate, but donated $50 to the cause. The meeting ended with the group singing "The Wearing of the Green."

The raid was a failure. Some of the men got as far as St. Albans, Vermont, but none made it to Canada. A few were arrested and some had to send home for money. Around the same time, Patrick Ford, the treasurer of the Brotherhood, absconded to South America with the organization's money.

Howe Tavern
William Howe opened the Howe Tavern on Court Street at the intersection of Church Street, at the site of the original St. Paul's Church. He sold it in 1818 to Mace Smith who renamed it the Punch Bowl Tavern. Smith sold it in 1833 and from then on it was used as either a tavern or a boardinghouse, being known as the Columbian House in the 1840s. It was nearly destroyed in a fire in 1891, at which point it was rebuilt for use as a private residence.

Bicentennial

Planning
At a town meeting held on November 9, 1835, a committee of 21 citizens was appointed to make arrangements for the celebration of the bicentennial anniversary of the incorporation and settlement of the town. On March 7, 1836, they reported that they engaged Samuel Foster Haven to compose and deliver an address on that occasion at the First Parish meetinghouse on September 21, 1836, at 11 a.m. All the clergy and choirs of the town were invited and asked to participate, and the Dedham Light Infantry Company was requested escort the procession. A dinner was to follow for the clergy and paid guests. On April 11, 1836, William Ellis, Enos Foord, Ira Cleveland, William King Gay, and Jabez Coney, Jr. were chosen as a committee to execute on the plan.

Procession
For nearly a year prior to the Town's bicentennial in 1836, a committee worked to make plans for a celebration. At dawn, church bells throughout the town began ringing and a 100 gun cannonade was launched. At 10:30 a.m., a procession left the new town house and processed through the streets of town. Nathaniel Guild, the grand marshal, was aided by 25 assistant marshals, Dedham's Light Infantry, and a military band. The "industrious classes" of the town divided the procession up by occupation. The mechanics, tradesmen, and manufacturers all had their own sections, but the farmers were excluded.

The agricultural workers of the town tried to participate but, having been denied the place of honor they thought they deserved, largely avoided the event. The organizers dismissed the farmers' complaints as the sour grapes of "a proud lump of aristocracy." They said that if any group was to be given the place of honor, it should be these "to whom we are indebted for the present prosperity of the town," and not those who were "far behind the age in many respects." It was the industrious classes, they believed, who had transformed Dedham from an agricultural community into a "thriving, businesslike and growing community." As a result, it was on their shoulders that "all of our hopes for the future rest."

At the Norfolk House, the procession was joined by Governor Edward Everett and a number of clergy and then proceeded to the First Parish green. There they passed through lines of the eight fire companies with their engines and apparatus, and 500 schoolchildren, and under an arch of evergreen boughs and flowers with "Incorporated 1636" on one side and "1836" on the other.

Service
The services were commenced by singing the anthem "Wake the Song of Jubilee." A prayer was then offered by the Rev. Alvan Lamson of the First Parish. The following hymn, composed especially for the occasion by the Rev. John Pierpont of Boston, was read by the Rev. Calvin Durfee of the South Parish and sung to the tune of Old Hundred.

Not now, O God, beneath the trees 
That shade this plain at night's cold noon  
Do Indian war songs load the breeze  
Or wolves sit howling to the moon  
The foes the fears our fathers felt  
Have with our fathers passed away  
And where in their dark hours they knelt  
We come to praise thee and to pray  
We praise thee that thou plantedst them  
And mad st thy heavens drop down their dew  
We pray that shooting from their stem  
We long may flourish where they grew  
And Father leave us not alone  
Thou hast been and art still our trust  
Be thou our fortress till our own  
Shall mingle with our father's dust  

Haven then gave an address on the history of the town. Another anthem was then sung and the services were closed with a Benediction by the Rev. Samuel B. Babcock of the Episcopal Church.

Dinner
After a prayer service, 600 people then processed to a pavilion erected to host a dinner on the land of John Bullard a few rods to the west. James Richardson presided at this dinner, assisted by John Endicott, George Bird, Abner Ellis, Theron Metcalf, and Thomas Barrows as Vice Presidents.

A blessing was asked by the Rev. John White of the West Parish and thanks returned by the Rev. Dr. Jonathan Homer of Newton. After the cloth was removed, Richardson gave a number of toasts, interspersed with music from the band:

1. The Day, with all its hallowed associations and congenial joys. May we prove true and faithful to our ancestors to our institutions and to posterity.

2. The memory of the first settlers of this town, their resolution, fortitude, perseverance, and devotion to civil and religious liberty. May we never in our zeal to outstrip them in accomplishments leave their virtues in the rear.

3. The Governor of the Commonwealth. The stock was the growth of our own soil; a branch is refreshing the State by its shadow, and its fruit has been healthful to the nation.

4. The University at Cambridge - the offspring of the labors and privations of the Puritan Fathers: while we venerate the parents, let us cherish the child and may it always be guided by as unerring a hand as now holds the reins.

5. Practical Education: That teaches what to do and when to do it and never to rest satisfied till it is done and well done.

6. The objects of the deep solicitude of our ancestry - the church and the school house. May the progress of religious, moral, and intellectual culture within transcend that of material beauty without.

7. The memory of the Rev. Samuel Dexter and Doctor Nathaniel Ames, Senior: Townsmen distinguished for piety and learning, science, and philosophy, and whose descendants have been and are among the gifted and illustrious men of our nation.

8. The principles and spirit that brought the pilgrims to these shores - cherished and venerated by succeeding ages, embodied in our constitution and laws, dispensing blessings over our whole country in peace or war, in weal or woe, may we never abandon those principles nor prove recreant to that spirit.

9. The memory of Governor Winthrop: His presence awed the savages during his life. He is indebted to a Savage for the best edition of his memorable Journal.

10. The Militia - the only safe defense of Republics. When legislators doubt, let them consult the spirits of Warren, Prescott and the Heroes of Bunker Hill.

After the toast to him, the governor spoke of Richard Everett, his ancestor and one of the early settlers of Dedham, and the multiple generations of his family who played a part in the history of the town. He also noted the "wonderful progress and development" in the commonwealth and the nation over the preceding four decades. He added that the advancement had been truer nowhere than in Dedham.

On announcing sentiments alluding to the guests or their ancestors, several besides the governor addressed the company, including John Davis, Judge of the District Court of the United States for the District of Massachusetts, Josiah Quincy III, President of Harvard College, Henry Alexander Scammell Dearborn, Adjutant General of the Commonwealth, William Jackson, Representative in Congress, Franklin Dexter, Alexander Hill Everett, and Robert C. Winthrop, Aid to Governor Everett. A great number of sentiments were also given by invited guests and by the citizens of the town.

Women's events
The women of the town spread a table the whole length of the lower floor of the Court House and furnished it with an ample collation. The court room was used as a drawing room and the library room was decorated with native and exotic fruits. A piano forte was placed in the court room and music formed part of the entertainment. The following hymn, prepared for the occasion by a lady, was sung by the ladies accompanying the piano:

Welcome, all dear friends, returning, 
Though from different paths you come; 
Welcome all whose hearts are yearning, 
For their dear-loved native home. 

Some in foreign lands have wandered, 
Some from the far west have come; 
Yet where er the footsteps lingered, 
Thought still turned to home sweet home. 

Many a well known face shall meet ye, 
Many a joyous smile shall bless; 
Many a kindred heart shall greet ye, 
While old friends around you press. 

Come then hasten with us gather, 
Round our simple festive board; 
Come and with us bless that Father, 
Who on all his love hath poured. 

Condescend to grant Thy blessing, 
Thou who dost our lives defend; 
While Thy children Thee addressing, 
Own Thee as their common Friend.

At the invitation of the ladies to who on the display, Governor Everett attended the ladies' event after the dinner. After sampling the fruit, the women sang the hymn again for him. He then returned to the court room and, from the bench, made a short address to the ladies in which he remarked on the privations, sufferings, fortitude, and piety of the first mothers and daughters of the town.

Military

Bursting of the Town cannon
In the mid-1800s, the town's 17th century cannon was ordered to be destroyed. The cannon was prepared for use during King Philip's War but was never used, and was ordered to be swung during the Revolution. Thomas Cobbett, who was a member of an artillery company when he was younger, dragged the cannon to a meadow far from the village, filled it with gunpowder and gravel, and then lit a long fuse. Pieces of the cannon were then distributed to residents. One, which went to Horatio Clarke, was subsequently used to hold open the door of the grocery store at the corner of School and Washington Streets.

War of 1812
A number of Dedham soldiers fought, and some died, in the Battle of Lundy's Lane during the War of 1812 under General Winfield Scott.

Powder House
In the mid-1800s, a group of boys pried open the doors of the powder house one winter day. They found kegs of stiff white card cartridges filled with damn powder and heavy bullets. There were also kegs filled with flints used in flintlock muskets.

The boys took the cartridges down to the meadows where fires burned for the benefit of the ice skaters nearby. The damp powder hissed and sizzled when thrown into the fires, and the bullets were melted down.

A proposal was made by Louis Bullard to turn the powder house into a memorial of prominent Dedhamites, with their names carved into the building. Nothing came of it.

Civil War

Several days after the fall of Fort Sumter, a mass meeting was held in Temperance Hall which opened with a dramatic presentation of the American flag. A total of 47 men signed up to serve in the war at that meeting, forming Dedham's first military unit since the Dedham militia was disbanded in 1846. More men enlisted in the coming days and the first company was formed in early May.

The troops would march and maneuver through the streets of the village. When they did so, townspeople would come out to watch and young boys would often tag along. During one training session on the Common, a young recruit opened an umbrella when it began to sprinkle. The man, a barber who worked on Church Street, was told by Captain Onion that he could not march with an umbrella. He chose to leave instead, listening to the jeers of the men who remained. An effigy of the "man with the umbrella" appeared hanging from a noose several days later at the corner of Church and High Streets, and the young man quickly left town.

On September 3, 1864, the 18th Massachusetts Infantry Regiment was mustered out of service. It had participated in some 15 battles. Of the 58 who enlisted from Dedham, 11 had fallen in the field, six had died from disease and wounds received in battle, eight had been discharged by reason of wounds, and 13 by reason of disability resulting from wounds. Of the whole company, 23 men had either died or fallen in battle. The regiment bore a part in nearly all the general battles of the Army of the Potomac except those of the Peninsula before Richmond. Upon their return, Dedham welcomed them with fitting ceremonies.

The 35th Massachusetts Infantry Regiment saw nearly three years of active service, beginning almost with the day of their arrival in the field. On its colors were inscribed, by an order of General Meade, the names of 13  battles to which was afterwards added a 14th. Their campaigns were not limited by a state or a department. They fought in Kentucky, East Tennessee, and Mississippi, as well as in Maryland and Virginia. In many of their battles, their position was among the most exposed to the enemy and sometimes in the most deadly conflicts. It became a proverb among the soldiers that the commanding officer of the 35th was sure to be struck down in every engagement.

Of the 68 who enlisted from Dedham, six were killed in battle and one more died soon after of his wounds, five died in the service from disease, eight were discharged on account of their wounds, and eleven for disability. The Town desired to give them a public welcome home, but they declined the honor, saying they preferred to pass without ceremony from the life of the soldier to that of the citizen.

Support from home
The women of the town immediately began working on producing supplies for the troops at the outbreak of war. In a span of 24 hours, they sewed 100 flannel shirts, of which 60 were sent to the state and 40 were reserved for Dedham soldiers. In the next two weeks, they made an additional 140 shirts, 140 pairs of flannel underwear, 126 towels, 132 handkerchiefs, 24 hospital shirts, 70 pincushions, 70 bags, and a handful of needlebooks. During the war, several Dedhamites traveled to visit the soldiers in camp, and several in service received furloughs to visit home.

After the Second Battle of Bull Run, a messenger burst into a church on Sunday morning with news of the defeat. The service was halted, and churchgoers organized into work parties. Less than six hours later, two wagon loads of clothing, bandages, medicines, and other supplies were on their way to Boston to be loaded onto an emergency supply train.

On May 6, 1861, the Town voted to "stand by the volunteers and to protect their families during the war." The Town Meeting also appropriated $10,000 for the cause. A number of other similar votes took place in the coming years such that the town spent a total of $136,090.81 on outfitting the troops, supporting the families, and providing bonuses for soldiers who enlisted.

Scenic community
Dedham Village was described at the time as "very pleasant, and possesses every inducement to render it a desirable residence for the mechanic or man of leisure."  The "scenery" of the town was described as "varied and picturesque" with "an appearance of being well kept, and the roads are noticeably good." A new county courthouse was built by Solomon Willard, the same architect who built the Bunker Hill Monument.  When it was remodeled in 1863 a dome was added, but it was too large and had to be removed.  A new dome sits atop the building today.

By the end of the century a gazetteer with entries for each city and town in Massachusetts described "the substantial old court house, with its massive columns and yellow dome; the county jail; the house of the boat club on the bank of the Charles; the beautiful building of the Dedham Historical Society; the ample town-hall, erected in 1867 as a memorial of the fallen brave; the old cemetery and the beautiful modern one; and the new library building with its 10,000 volumes,— making a list of attractions such as few towns can show." On the north side of Court Street was a building called the "Flat Iron Building" due to its wedge-like shape.

In 1832, a tree in West Dedham, today Westwood, was named for the fortuneteller Moll Pitcher, who enjoyed the shade beneath the tree during her travels to the area. On a hot summer day, she once asked a workman for a sip of his cider.  When he refused, she broke her clay pipe in two and told the worker that the same thing would happen to his neck. She also said that the Nanhattan Street house he was working on would burn to the ground, which it did years later.

In the mid-1800s stood a large sycamore tree at the intersection of Court and Church Streets. Tradition holds that this was the tree to which those who broke the law would be tied and whipped. It was also the location of the town's pillory.

Louis Mellen drowned in Wigwam Pond.

Subdivisions
In the 19th century many former farms became businesses and homes for those who commuted into Boston.

Nathaniel Whiting arrived in Dedham in 1641 and over the course of the next 182 years he and his descendants owned mills along Mother Brook and a great swath of farmland.  In 1871 William Whiting, the last member of the family to own a mill, sold the remainder of the family farm. Charles Sanderson began laying it out in a subdevelopment to become known as Oakdale. By 1895, Oakdale was still largely woodland, with only about a dozen houses clustered around the Ashcroft railroad station. Today, Whiting Ave is home to both the High School and the Middle School, and Sanderson Avenue runs into Oakdale Square.

In 1867, the Farrington farm was laid out into house plots by the Elmwood Land Company and became the Endicott neighborhood, and in 1873 the Whiting/ Turner tract of land was developed into Ashcroft. Fairbanks Park was developed in 1895.

Schools

Though Dedham had the first public school in the country, the Commonwealth sued the Town in 1819 for failing to hire a grammar school teacher.

As early as 1848, Rev. Dr. Alvan Lamson of the First Church and Parish in Dedham was making the argument that the districts should be abolished and Horace Mann said that the law allowing districts was "beyond comparison, the most pernicious law ever pass in the Commonwealth on the subject of schools." The districts were discontinued in 1866 when the Town purchased all 11 buildings for a total of $49,180 and returned their value to the taxpayers of the respective districts.

The first public school system in the country had, by 1890, grown "complete system of graded schools, which are provided for in thirteen buildings having a value of about $60,000; to which has recently been added a new high school building in a central location in which have been embodied all known improvements." On January 11, 1895, the citizens of the town gathered in Memorial Hall to celebrate the 250th anniversary of the founding of the first free, tax supported public school in the nation.  A "felicitous" speech was made by Governor Frederic T. Greenhalge and an "historical address" was made by Rev. Carlos Slafter.  Lieutenant Governor Roger Wolcott, Judge Ely and the Honorable F. A. Hill also spoke.

Parishes, precincts, and new towns

With the division and subdivision of so many communities, Dedham has been called the "Mother of Towns."

Dover
At the 1729 election the village reasserted its political power by taking back control of the Board of Selectmen. Four men from the village were elected, including Ebenezer Woodward, along with one man from the Springfield area of town. Shortly thereafter, Springfield became its own precinct in an apparent quid pro quo. It later became Dover in 1836.

Norwood
The south precinct had long complained that they did not receive a fair share of services from the Town. In 1872, the complaint was focused around the lack of opportunities for their children to attend the high school. In that year, they seceded and formed the town of Norwood, Massachusetts.

Westwood
In 1897, the third parish became the final area to break away directly from Dedham, incorporating as Westwood. There had been calls for a partition since at least 1857.

Waldeddo and Back Bay
In the 1850s, a proposal was made by James Tisdale to take portions of Dedham, Dover, and Walpole to create a new town of Waldeddo, but nothing came from it.

In the late 1800s, when the Commonwealth of Massachusetts was filling in Boston's Back Bay, most of the landfill came from nearby Needham. When the gravel pits there were exhausted, they turned to other area communities, including Dedham.

Other
During his 1817 tour of the country, President James Monroe visited Dedham and stayed at the home of future Congressman Edward Dowse. A large number of people escorted him from the Norfolk border to the Boston line, including artillery and Crane's Division Ist of Militia. Monroe reviewed the troops on the Town Common. He met residents the next morning when he walked from Dowse's home to Polly's Tavern.

When spiritualism swept over the country in the 1840s, many in Dedham took interest and attempted to communicate with the dead.

Post offices
There were seven post offices, mostly in rail depots or grocery stores, in the 19th century. Dr. Elisha Thayer an apothecary named Tower, and Ambrose Galucia were postmasters. Thayer ran the post office office from a small addition on the east side of his house from 1833 until his resignation in 1855. Galucia was postmaster at the Memorial Hall post office before leaving for California during the California Gold Rush.

Landon Moore attempted to rob a post office in 1877.

Animals
In the early 1800s, the quarterly militia training days had become drunken and licentious affairs.  In response, the General Court forbid the sale of alcohol in quantities of less than 15 gallons on training days.  Dedham, as the county seat, hosted a number of militia companies on training days. A farmer from Dedham's Low Plains came to Common with a pig he said was striped by a zebra.  For 6.25 cents, people could enter the tent to view the animal. With admission, everyone was entitled a free glass of rum or gin. The incident upset many in the temperance movement and was the topic of a number of pamphlets. A popular song was also written about it.

In 1870, a horse owned by John Gardiner broke free from the carriage to which it was hitched and took off down River Place. Crowds tried to stop it when it reached Memorial Hall, but the horse turned instead and ran into Andrew Norris' grocery store on the first floor. The front assembly of the carriage, which was trailing behind, hit a granite hitching post, and turned the assembly vertically so that one wheel was on the air and the other was scraping along the ground. The horse bolted through the store, past a rack of glassware and crockery, and then out the other door without causing any damage.

Notes

References

Works cited

19th century in Massachusetts